Stonybrook is a census-designated place (CDP) in York County, Pennsylvania, United States. The population was 2,384 at the 2010 census. The area was delineated as the Stonybrook-Wilshire CDP for the 2000 census.

Geography
Stonybrook is located at  (39.9799, -76.6317) in Springettsbury Township, east of York.

References

Census-designated places in York County, Pennsylvania
Springettsbury Township, York County, Pennsylvania